Caledonia is a community that is part of the former town of Glace Bay in the Canadian province of Nova Scotia, located in the Cape Breton Regional Municipality.

References
  Caledonia on Destination Nova Scotia

Communities in the Cape Breton Regional Municipality
General Service Areas in Nova Scotia